The Swing-Europe Parashell, also simply called Das Trike, is a German powered parachute that was designed by Oliver Münzer and is produced by Swing-Europe of Ebringen. The aircraft is supplied complete and ready-to-fly.

Design and development
The Parashell was designed to comply with the Fédération Aéronautique Internationale microlight category and the US FAR 103 Ultralight Vehicles rules. It features a  span parachute-style wing, single-place accommodation, tricycle landing gear and a single  Hirth F-30 engine in pusher configuration.

The aircraft carriage is built from a combination of composite materials and aluminium tubing, with a composite partial cockpit fairing. In flight steering is accomplished via handles that actuate the canopy brakes, creating roll and yaw. On the ground the aircraft has foot-pedal-controlled nosewheel steering. The main landing gear incorporates spring rod suspension.

Operational history
Reviewer Jean-Pierre le Camus, writing in 2003, said the aircraft would appeal to pilots who like comfort and described the design as "beautiful" and having "visual flair".

Specifications (Parashell)

References

External links

Parashell
2000s German sport aircraft
2000s German ultralight aircraft
Single-engined pusher aircraft
Powered parachutes